Dismiss the Mystery is the seventh studio album released by the Christian rock band, Salvador.

The single "Shine" off the release ranked number No. 2 on Billboards Hot Christian Songs and number No. 20 on their Christian Songs (Year End).

Christian songwriter Jason Ingram received the 2007 SESAC "Christian Songwriter of the Year" award with "Shine" being one of his most notable contributions.

Track listing

"Te Enaltezco Dios" is sung completely in Spanish.

 Personnel Salvador Nic Gonzales – lead vocals, acoustic guitars, electric guitars 
 Chris Bevins – keyboards, programming, backing vocals, horn arrangements 
 Josh Gonzales – bass, backing vocals 
 Ben Cordonero – drums, percussion, backing vocals 
 Jared Solis – saxophones, trombone, backing vocals, horn arrangements 
 Edwin Santiago – trumpet, flugelhorn, backing vocals Additional musicians Clint Lagerberg – electric guitars 
 Robert Vilera – congas, bongos, timbales, bells, claves, güiro

 Production 
 Otto Price – executive producer,  A&R
 Nic Gonzales – producer 
 Chris Bevins – producer, engineer 
 Mike Hersh – assistant engineer 
 Boo McLeod – assistant engineer
 Drew Douthit – mixing 
 Bryan Lenox – mixing 
 Shane D. Wilson – mixing 
 Andrew Mendelson – mastering
 Cheryl H. McTyre – A&R administration
 Katherine Petillo – creative direction, cover design
 Roy Roper – design
 Thomas Petillo – photography
 Bonnie Markel – wardrobe styling
 Lucy Santamassino – grooming, hair stylist 
 Michael Smith & Associates – managementStudios'
 Recorded at Promiseland Recording Studios and Pedernales Studio (Austin, Texas); Working Man's Studio (Franklin, Tennessee); The Padded Room (Nashville, Tennessee).
 Mixed at Uncle Tom's Cabin and Pentavarit (Nashville, Tennessee).
 Mastered at Georgetown Masters (Nashville, Tennessee).

Chart performance

References

2006 albums
Salvador (band) albums